The Portland Rugby Football Club (PRFC) is a US rugby union club established in Portland, Oregon in 1961 and is a non-profit organization. PRFC is a member of USA Rugby and competes in the Pacific Northwest Rugby Football Union. 

Portland Rugby won the 2011 PNRFU Championship and placed 9th nationally at the USA Rugby Men's Division II Sweet 16s in Chula Vista, CA.

In its 50 years of existence, the PRFC has promoted the sport of rugby through competition as well as fundraising and charitable contributions. Portland Rugby has participated in 3 international tours.

The PRFC is open to adult males and females of all experience levels.

Current Teams
PRFC now includes a men's Senior Division II team and a men's Senior Division III teams, both known as the "Pigs", and an 'old boys' side made up of players age 35 and older, known as the "Old Boars."  It is also now home to a women's Senior Division II club.

Pitch
After a 2011 agreement which saw the installation of professional rugby posts at the new pitch, Portland Parks and Recreation allows the PRFC to play its home matches at Northgate Park in Portland, OR. Practices are generally held at Montavilla Park on NE 82nd Ave, or Delta Park of Portland.

References

External links 
Official website

American rugby union teams
Rugby union teams in Oregon
Sports teams in Portland, Oregon
Rugby clubs established in 1961
1961 establishments in Oregon